John Mathieson Anderson, FBA (born 1941) is a British linguist and academic. He is Emeritus Professor of English Language at the University of Edinburgh. In the 1970s, Anderson revived the idea of localism, which is the linguistic theory that all grammatical cases, including syntactic cases, are based on a local meaning; however Anderson used a generative approach to the idea. Collaborating with Colin J. Ewen, he wrote the first detailed overview of the theory of dependency phonology in their 1987 work Principles of Dependency Phonology.

Notable works

References

1941 births
Living people
Fellows of the British Academy
Scottish linguists
Academics of the University of Edinburgh